Orietta Lozano (born 1956) is a contemporary Colombian poet.

Orietta Lozano was born in Cali, Colombia. Lozano served as director of the Biblioteca Municipal del Centenario in Cali. She has been awarded the Eduardo Cote Lamus national prize for her poetry in 1986 and the award for best erotic verse by the Silva Poetry House in 1993. Lozano was invited to the 13th Biennale Internationale des Poètes in Paris in 1995. Her poetry is noted for its sensuality and eroticism.

Selected works 
Books
Fuego secreto (1980)
Memoria de los espejos (1983)
El vampiro esperado (1987)
Antología de Alejandra Pizarnik (Ensayo, 1992)
Luminar (Novela, 1994)
Antología amorosa (1996)
El solar de la esfera (2002)
Agua ebria (2005)
Peldaños de agua (2010)
Resplandor del Abismo (2011)
Albacea de la Luz (2015)

Awards
Eduardo Cote Lamus National Poetry Award, 1986
Aurelio Arturo National Poetry Award, 1992
Best Erotic Verse, Casa de Poesía Silva, 1994

Quotes
"Escribo para ver el resplandor"

References 

1956 births
Living people
Colombian women poets
Colombian women novelists
20th-century Colombian poets
21st-century Colombian poets
People from Cali
20th-century Colombian novelists
20th-century Colombian women writers
21st-century Colombian women writers
21st-century Colombian novelists